Maggiora was an Italian coachbuilder from Moncalieri near Turin. They produced the Fiat Barchetta and the Lancia Kappa Coupé which was designed by Centro Stile Lancia. In 2003 the company was closed.

The company was formed in 1925 as Martelleria Maggiora by Arturo Maggiora as a high quality car body maker - a coach builder or 'Carrozzeria'. Their work has graced many Fiat and Lancia cars like the early Fiat 1100 Viotti Giardiniettas and the Lancia Flaminia Tourers. The company was grown and extended, with several Abarth and Cisitalia bodies produced. In 1951 it moved to Borgo San Pietro Moncalieri where car like the Glas (BMW) GT (1963), Glas V8 (1965) and the Maserati Mistral (1963) were built. Rocco Motto was a team leader at Maggiora until 1932 when we opened his own workshop.

Maggiora merged with Sanmarco and Lamier to form IRMA SpA in 1991 - later a major supplier to the Ducato range. Maggiora SRL took over the old Lancia factory in Chivasso north of Turin in 1992, and produced there from October 1992 to 1994 the last Integrale Evoluzione. The new capacities in the Lancia factory were later used to produce the Fiat Barchetta - at around 50 bodies a day. Some complete cars were produced here too (including the rare Kappa Coupe).

In addition many design studies, prototypes, special orders were produced by Maggiora, these have included soft top Unos and Cinquecentos, special Integrales, a Barchetta Coupes, a Puntograle, the Lancia Thesis Coupe prototype.

Cars produced by Maggiora
 Lancia Aurelia B20 
 Lancia Flaminia Touring 
 Alfa Romeo 2000 Touring 
 Fiat 2300 S Coupé
 Glas V8
 Maserati Mistral coupé and Spyder
 De Tomaso Mangusta
 Alfa Romeo Junior Zagato
 De Tomaso Pantera
 Fiat Gobi (1984, concept car)
 Fiat Halley (1985, concept car)
 Fiat Cinquecento Cita (1992 concept car, developed with Stola and Itca)
 Fiat Cinquecento Birba (1992, concept car)
 Fiat Scia (1993, concept car)
 Fiat Barchetta 
 Fiat Barchetta Coupé
 Fiat Barchetta Trofeo
 Fiat Armadillo (1996 concept car)
 Lancia Kappa Coupé
 Willys AW 380 Berlinetta

Gallery

References

External links 

Coachbuilders of Italy
Turin motor companies
Defunct motor vehicle manufacturers of Italy
Vehicle manufacturing companies established in 1925
Italian companies established in 1925
Vehicle manufacturing companies disestablished in 1994
1994 disestablishments in Italy